Carex umbellata, the parasol sedge, is a species of flowering plant in the genus Carex, native to Canada and the central and eastern US, and introduced to the Dominican Republic. Its seeds are dispersed by ants.

References

umbellata
Flora of Western Canada
Flora of Eastern Canada
Flora of the North-Central United States
Flora of the Northeastern United States
Flora of the Southeastern United States
Plants described in 1805
Flora without expected TNC conservation status